West Looe, often spelt Westlow or alternative Westlowe, in Cornwall, England, was a rotten borough represented in the House of Commons of England from 1535 to 1707, in the House of Commons of Great Britain from 1707 to 1800, and in the House of Commons of the United Kingdom from 1801 to 1832. It elected two Members of Parliament (MP) by the bloc vote system of election. It was disfranchised in the Reform Act 1832.

History
West Looe was one of a number of Cornish boroughs enfranchised in the Tudor period, and like almost all of them it was a rotten borough from the start, with the size and importance of the community that comprised it quite inadequate to justify its representation. The borough consisted of the town of West Looe in Cornwall, connected by bridge across the River Looe to East Looe, which was also a parliamentary borough. From the reign of Edward VI, West Looe and East Looe were jointly a borough, returning two members of Parliament; however, under Queen Elizabeth the two towns were separated, and each thereafter returned two members except between 1654 and 1658, when they were once again represented jointly as East Looe and West Looe, by one member of the First and Second Protectorate Parliaments. At this early period, West Looe was sometimes alternatively referred to as Portby or Portpigham.

Franchise
In 1660, the Commons had resolved that "the right of election is in the freemen and inhabitants paying scot and lot". But this determination proved to be ambiguous. It was presumably intended to secure the vote to the inhabitants whether or not they were freemen, but it was quickly re-interpreted as restricting the vote to those who were both freemen and residents. This arrangement was eventually formalised into a franchise held by the Mayor and members of the Corporation, providing they lived in the town. This corporation, which seems to have been set up for the purpose, consisted of 12 "capital burgesses" and an indefinite number of "free burgesses". The free burgesses were appointed by the corporation and tended to be few in number; furthermore, a small number of prominent local families provided the majority of both the corporation and the free burgesses. There were just 12 registered electors in 1816, and 19 in 1831.

In practice, this meant that the power to choose the MPs was in the hands of the local landowner or "proprietor", making West Looe (like East Looe) one of the most notorious of the rotten boroughs. For many years at the time of the Reform Act, West Looe had been controlled by the local gentry families of first the Trelawneys and later the Bullers of nearby Morval  (which also controlled East Looe and Saltash), and many members of the Buller family sat for the borough in the House of Commons; nevertheless, they generally assuaged local feelings by allowing other local families some influence over one of the two seats.

Elections
Elections at West Looe were almost always uncontested. There was not one contest at a general election between 1700 and 1832, although a by-election in 1765 was fought out when an alliance of local families clearly felt they had enough sway on the corporation to challenge the Buller domination; the Buller candidate won.

Their uncontested nature did not guarantee that elections ran smoothly. West Looe waited only until its second Parliament to have its first controversial election, choosing Dr Alexander Nowell, a Prebendary of Westminster, as one of its members in the second Parliament of 1553. At this stage the eligibility or otherwise of clergy to sit in the Commons was not established, and a committee of six was appointed to consider the case on 12 October 1553. The following day it reported that, since his ecclesiastical rank entitled him to a vote in Convocation, he could not sit in the House of Commons. A writ to elect a new member in his place was ordered, though there is no record that such an election was ever made. Nowell's case became established precedent as to the eligibility of similar candidates in future places. (The situation was not finally clarified until clergy were declared ineligible by statute early in the 19th century.)

Nearly two centuries later, West Looe was again found to have elected an ineligible candidate when it chose Edward Trelawny in 1734, who was a Commissioner of Customs at the time.

Abolition
In 1831, when commissioners were collecting the statistics on which the Reform Act was founded, West Looe had a population of 593 and 126 houses; the borough and town were coterminous, giving no scope for expanding the boundaries to save it from disfranchisement. The borough was abolished by the Reform Act 1832, its voters being absorbed into the new Eastern Cornwall county division, which had its place of election at Bodmin.

Members of Parliament

1553–1629

1640–1832
{| class="wikitable"
|-
!colspan="3"|Year!!First member!!First party!!Second member!!Second party
|-
|style="background-color: white" | 
|style="background-color: white" |
|April 1640
| Anthony Mildmay || 
| George Potter ||
|-
|style="background-color: " | 
|rowspan="3" style="background-color: " |
|November 1640
| Henry Killigrew ||Royalist 
|rowspan="3"| Thomas Arundell ||rowspan="3"|Parliamentarian
|-
|style="background-color: white" |
|January 1644
|colspan="2"|Killigrew disabled to sit – seat vacant
|-
|rowspan="2" style="background-color: white" |
|1647
|rowspan="2"| John Arundell ||rowspan="2"|
|-
|rowspan="2" style="background-color: white" |
|November 1648
|rowspan="2" colspan="2"|Thomas Arundell died – seat left vacant
|-
|style="background-color: white" |
|December 1648
|colspan="2"|John Arundell excluded in Pride's Purge – seat vacant
|-
|style="background-color: white" |
|style="background-color: white" |
|1653
|colspan="4"|West Looe was unrepresented in the Barebones Parliament
|-
|style="background-color: white" |
|rowspan="2" style="background-color: white" |
|1654 
| John Blackmore ||
|rowspan="2" colspan="2"| East Looe and West Looe jointly elected a single member to the First  and Second Parliaments of the Protectorate 
|-
|style="background-color: white" |
|1656 
| John Buller ||
|-
|style="background-color: white" |
|style="background-color: white" |
|January 1659 
| Dr William Petty ||
| William Whitelock ||
|-
|style="background-color: white" |
|style="background-color: white" |
|May 1659
|colspan="4"|Not represented in the restored Rump|-
|style="background-color: white" | 
|style="background-color: white" |
|April 1660
| John Buller || 
| John Kendall ||
|-
|rowspan="4" style="background-color: white" | 
|style="background-color: white" |
|April 1661
|rowspan="4"|John Trelawny || rowspan="4"|
| John Nicholas||
|-
|style="background-color: white" |
|June 1661
| Sir Henry Vernon ||
|-
|style="background-color: white" |
|1677
| John Trelawny ||
|-
|style="background-color: white" |
|1680
| Jonathan Trelawny ||
|-
|rowspan="2" style="background-color: white" | 
|style="background-color: white" |
|1685
|rowspan="2"| James Kendall || rowspan="2"|
| Henry Trelawny ||
|-
|style="background-color: white" |
|1689
| Percy Kirke ||
|-
|style="background-color: " | 
|style="background-color: white" |
|1690
| Edward Seymour || Tory
| Jonathan Trelawny ||
|-
|rowspan="2" style="background-color: white" | 
|style="background-color: white" |
|1695
|rowspan="2"| James Kendall || rowspan="2"|
| John Mountstephen ||
|-
|rowspan="3" style="background-color: white" | 
|1701
|rowspan="3"| The Earl of Ranelagh|| rowspan="3"|
|-
|style="background-color: white" |
|July 1702
| Sidney Godolphin ||
|-
|style="background-color: white" |
|December 1702
| Richard Hele ||
|-
|style="background-color: white" | 
|style="background-color: " |
|1703
| Charles Seymour || 
| Henry Poley ||
|-
|rowspan="5" style="background-color: " | 
|style="background-color: white" |
|1705
|rowspan="5"|Sir Charles Hedges || rowspan="5"| Tory
| John Mountstephen ||
|-
|style="background-color: white" |
|1707
| Francis Palmes ||
|-
|style="background-color: white" |
|1708
| John Conyers ||
|-
|style="background-color: white" |
|1710
| Arthur Maynwaring ||
|-
|rowspan="2" style="background-color: white" | 
|April 1713
|rowspan="2"| John Trelawny || rowspan="2"|
|-
|style="background-color: white" |
|September 1713
| Rear Admiral Sir Charles Wager ||
|-
|rowspan="2" style="background-color: white" | 
|style="background-color: white" |
|1715
|rowspan="2"| Rear Admiral George Delaval || rowspan="2"|
| Thomas Maynard ||
|-
|rowspan="2" style="background-color: white" | 
|1722
|rowspan="2"| Sir John Trelawny || rowspan="2"|
|-
|rowspan="2" style="background-color: white" | 
|1724
|rowspan="2"| Edward Trelawny || rowspan="2"|
|-
|rowspan="4" style="background-color: white" | 
|1727
|rowspan="4"| John Willes || rowspan="4"|
|-
|style="background-color: white" |
|1733
| Thomas Walker ||
|-
|style="background-color: white" |
|1734
| Edward Trelawny||
|-
|rowspan="2" style="background-color: white" | 
|1735
|rowspan="2"| John Owen || rowspan="2"|
|-
|style="background-color: white" |
|1737
| John Strange ||
|-
|rowspan="2" style="background-color: white" | 
|style="background-color: " |
|1741
|rowspan="2"| Benjamin Keene || rowspan="2"|
| Admiral Sir Charles Wager || Whig
|-
|rowspan="3" style="background-color: white" | 
|1743
|rowspan="3"| John Frederick || rowspan="3"|
|-
|style="background-color: white" |
|1747
| William Noel ||
|-
|rowspan="3" style="background-color: white" | 
|1757
|rowspan="3"| William Trelawny || rowspan="3"|
|-
|style="background-color: white" |
|1761
| Francis Buller ||
|-
|rowspan="2" style="background-color: white" | 
|1765
|rowspan="2"| John Sargent || rowspan="2"|
|-
|rowspan="2" style="background-color: " | 
|1767
|rowspan="2"| James Townsend || rowspan="2"| Whig
|-
|style="background-color: white" |
|1768
| William Graves ||
|-
|rowspan="4" style="background-color: white" | 
|style="background-color: white" |
|1774
|rowspan="4"| Sir William James || rowspan="4"|
| Charles Ogilvie ||
|-
|style="background-color: white" |
|1775
| John Rogers ||
|-
|style="background-color: white" |
|1780
| John Buller I ||
|-
|rowspan="2" style="background-color: white" | 
|1782
|rowspan="2"| John Cocks || rowspan="2"|
|-
|style="background-color: white" |
|January 1784
| John Buller I ||
|-
|rowspan="2" style="background-color: white" | 
|style="background-color: white" |
|April 1784
|rowspan="2"| John Scott || rowspan="2"|
| John Lemon ||
|-
|style="background-color: white" |
|August 1784
| James Adams ||
|-
|style="background-color: white" | 
|style="background-color: white" |
|1790
| Sir John de la Pole ||
| John Pardoe ||
|-
|rowspan="2" style="background-color: white" | 
|style="background-color: white" |
|May 1796
|rowspan="2"|Sitwell Sitwell || rowspan="2"|
| John Buller II ||
|-
|style="background-color: white" |
|November 1796
| John Hookham Frere ||
|-
|rowspan="2" style="background-color: white" | 
|style="background-color: white" |
|1802
|rowspan="2"| James Buller II || rowspan="2"|
| Thomas Smith ||
|-
|rowspan="2" style="background-color: white" | 
|1803
|rowspan="2"| Quintin Dick || rowspan="2"|
|-
|rowspan="3" style="background-color: white" | 
|1805
|rowspan="3"| Ralph Daniell || rowspan="3"|
|-
|style="background-color: white" |
|1806
| James Buller II ||
|-
|style="background-color: white" |
|January 1812
| Sir Joseph Yorke ||
|-
|style="background-color: " | 
|style="background-color: " |
|October 1812
| Charles Buller I ||Whig
| Anthony Buller ||Whig
|-
|rowspan="2" style="background-color: " | 
|style="background-color: " |
|1816
|rowspan="2"| Sir Charles Hulse || rowspan="2"|Tory
| Hon. Henry Fitzgerald-de Ros ||Tory
|-
|style="background-color: " |
|1818
| Henry Goulburn ||Tory
|-
|rowspan="2" style="background-color: " | 
|style="background-color: " |
|1826
|rowspan="2"| Charles Buller I || rowspan="2"|Whig
| John Buller II ||Whig
|-
|rowspan="3" style="background-color: " | 
|1827
|rowspan="3"| Sir Charles Hulse || rowspan="3"|Tory
|-
|style="background-color: " |
|1830
| Charles Buller II ||Whig
|-
|style="background-color: " |
|1831
| Sir Anthony Buller ||Whig
|-
|style="background-color: white" | 
|style="background-color: white" | 
|1832
|colspan="5"| Constituency abolished|}
Notes

ElectionsNote: It is known that Townsend claimed 42 votes and that "the greater part" of these were declared invalid by the Returning Officer, but beyond the fact that his final total must have been lower than Sargent's the figure is not determinableSee also

 East Looe (UK Parliament constituency)
 Unreformed House of Commons

References
 Thomas Bond, Topographical and historical sketches of the boroughs of East and West Looe, in the county of Cornwall (London: J Nichols & Son, 1823)
 D Brunton & D H Pennington, Members of the Long Parliament (London: George Allen & Unwin, 1954)
 Cobbett's Parliamentary history of England, from the Norman Conquest in 1066 to the year 1803 (London: Thomas Hansard, 1808) 
 Sir Lewis Namier and John Brooke, The House of Commons 1754–1790 (London: HMSO, 1964)
 J E Neale, The Elizabethan House of Commons (London: Jonathan Cape, 1949) 
 J Holladay Philbin, Parliamentary Representation 1832 – England and Wales (New Haven: Yale University Press, 1965)
 Edward Porritt and Annie G Porritt, The Unreformed House of Commons (Cambridge University Press, 1903)
 Henry Stooks Smith, The Parliaments of England from 1715 to 1847'' (2nd edition, edited by FWS Craig – Chichester: Parliamentary Reference Publications, 1973)
 
 

Parliamentary constituencies in Cornwall (historic)
Constituencies of the Parliament of the United Kingdom established in 1553
Constituencies of the Parliament of the United Kingdom disestablished in 1832
Rotten boroughs
Looe